Sofia the First is an American animated fantasy children's television series. The show follows a young peasant girl named Sofia (Ariel Winter), who becomes a princess after her mother marries the king of Enchancia. Episodes focus on her adventures and bonds with others, including her animal friends, with whom she communicates through an amulet that blesses and curses her based upon the goodness of her actions.

Created by Craig Gerber, Sofia the First aimed to employ relatable situations in a fantasy world; according to Gerber, Sofia's position as a child of a single mother allowed the team to explore themes of adaptation and connect to modern children. The series pilot was broadcast on November 18, 2012, on Disney Channel. The series itself premiered on January 11, 2013, on Disney Junior, aired for four seasons, and concluded on September 8, 2018.

Sofia the First was praised for its music, animation, characters, and messages. It received some of the highest viewership for a preschool cable television series; at one point, it became the category's most-watched program, with a variety of merchandise being influenced by the series, such as theme park rides and books. Sofia the First was nominated for 11 Daytime Emmy Awards, including two wins, and received the 2014 Annie Award for Best General Audience Animated TV/Broadcast Production for Preschool Children. However, the series received criticism for incorrectly identifying its titular character as Latina; the controversy ultimately led to the creation of the spin-off Elena of Avalor.

Plot
A young girl named Sofia and her widowed mother, Miranda, have lived a peasant life in the kingdom of Enchancia. One day, the widowed King Roland of Enchancia and Miranda fall in love and get married. As she eases into her new role as a princess, Sofia goes on numerous adventures. She also bonds with her new family, including her step-siblings Amber and James, and settles into her new royal school, where Flora, Fauna and Merryweather from Sleeping Beauty are headmistresses.

Roland gives Sofia an amulet, which blesses her for good deeds and curses her for wrongdoings. She becomes friends with rabbit Clover and birds Mia and Robin after the amulet gives her the ability to communicate with animals. The amulet also links "all the princesses there ever were", calling them to help each other when one is in need. Cedric, the royal sorcerer, regularly attempts to steal Sofia's amulet, knowing of its abilities. Cedric plans to use the power of the amulet to overthrow the royal family and take over the kingdom of Enchancia. As he grows closer to Sofia, however, he becomes doubtful about stealing the amulet, and eventually reveals his intentions and apologizes for his actions.

In the third season, Sofia's Aunt Tilly gives her a special book that guides her to a secret library hidden in the castle. The library is filled with hundreds of unfinished books; Sofia is responsible for giving each story a happy ending. In the fourth season, a book leads her to the Mystic Isles, a land above the clouds where all magic originates. She saves the Isles from the evil crystal master Prisma and begins training to become the Protector of the Ever Realm. Prisma discovers evil sorceress Vor and frees her using the "Wicked Nine", in spite of Sofia and the other protectors' efforts to stop her. In the series finale, Sofia defeats Vor and officially becomes the Protector of the Ever Realm.

Cast and characters

Ariel Winter as Sofia Cordova
Wayne Brady as Clover
Darcy Rose Byrnes as Princess Amber
Zach Callison (Pilot/Season 1-2), Tyler Merna (Season 2-3/Elena of Avalor Pilot) and Nicolas Cantu (3-4) as Prince James 
Sara Ramirez as Miranda Cordova
Travis Willingham as King Roland II
Tim Gunn as Baileywick
Jess Harnell as Cedric the Sorcerer

Production
For five years, Disney writers, child-development and early-education experts and storytelling consultants worked to create a television show that would bypass stereotypes of evil stepmothers and girls requiring princes to save them. Disney also wanted it to spawn various merchandise. Craig Gerber, who was writing for the company's Tinker Bell film series, was approached by Disney Junior's Nancy Kanter to create a television series about princesses aimed at children aged two to seven. Though excited to conceive a fantasy world and Princess fairy tale, Gerber wanted the show to be both entertaining and educational, teaching children how to be better people and solutions to social problems. His son often emulated a variety of fantasy characters with whom he had little in common. In the hopes the show could be a "magic mirror" for his son, Gerber employed relatable situations into the fantasy world, which became the genesis for Princess Sofia.

As a child, Gerber lived with his single mother, and her boyfriend and his daughter, whom Gerber considered to be a de facto stepsister. As an adult, he learnt that when step-siblings and parents were involved, ordinary childhood concerns were typically amplified. Decades later, while attempting to lend a contemporary viewpoint to a fairy tale world, he had an epiphany: He considered the possibilities if Sofia was not born a princess and instead married into a royal family. Step-sisters are a common theme in fairy tales. However, having a mixed royal family that included both a father and a mother appeared to be a prime opportunity to convey stories to which modern children could connect. According to Gerber, Sofia being the child of a single mother provided to a simple method to explore themes of adaptation. He hoped for Sofia to serve as a good role model in a society where many young girls desire to be princesses, demonstrating attributes and learning skills that young girls (and boys) could remember long after. Gerber planned to reference multicultural family dynamics as well.

The editor of Tangled (2010) recommended Kevin Kliesch, who helped orchestrate the film, to Disney Channel as a composer for Sofia the First. The network was positive towards his background, and he booked the job. Kliesch was usually given one to two weeks to write the music, meaning he had to compose for at least three minutes a day to meet this deadline. The score draws upon the sounds of previous Disney films, since the producers hoped to avoid "typical cartoon music". Similarly, in the original songs, Gerber and the composer included aspects of Motown, jazz, and hip-hop music, rather than "cloying kiddie sounds".

Episodes

Distribution

Broadcast
The series pilot—the television film Once Upon a Princess—premiered on Disney Channel on November 18, 2012. The series itself premiered on January 11, 2013; the show aired on Disney Channel during its Disney Junior block, in addition to the 24-hour channel Disney Junior. Sofia the First was renewed for a second season two months later. In November, the series aired the special "The Floating Palace". Its first season concluded on February 14, 2014. A month earlier, the series had been renewed for a third season. The second season premiered on March 7, 2014, and concluded on August 12, 2015, with a primetime special, titled "The Curse of Princess Ivy", airing on November 23, 2014. On April 14, 2015, the series was renewed for a fourth and final season by Disney Junior, which began its broadcast on April 28, 2017. The extended series finale special "Forever Royal" was aired on September 8, 2018.

Home media and streaming
The series premiere episode, titled "Just One of the Princes", was made available on several platforms, including Disney Channel SVOD and iTunes, on January 4, 2013, a week before its airdate. Sofia the First was streamable on Netflix; its second and fourth seasons were made available in January 2016 and October 2018, respectively. The show was moved to Disney+ after its Netflix contract expired. In October 2022, the series was released on Disney+ in the United States. Disney has also released several episodes on DVD, including "The Floating Palace", "The Curse of Princess Ivy", and the television film Once Upon a Princess.

Reception

Critical reception
Sofia the First has received generally positive reviews. In May 2020, Time Out named it one of the 30 best children's cartoons. The show's animation and music received praise. IndieWire Greg Ehrbar commended the fluidity in the cinematography and computer animation; Emily Ashby of Common Sense Media said the "crisp animation ... brings ... Sofia and a well-rounded supporting cast [to life]". The two praised the music as "lively" and "tuneful", respectively, with Ehrbar comparing the "lavishly orchestrated" score to that of a Disney animated feature.

Critics lauded the characters. Ashby referred to Sofia as a "[s]punky, well-rounded princess", praising her influence on other characters and requests for advice when needed. She also thought the supporting cast displayed positive traits, such as loyalty, honesty, and friendship. Matt Villano, who writes for Today, enjoyed the titular character's villager friends, whom he believe emulate real-life modern teenagers. Ashby and Villano were positive towards Sofia the First themes. According to the latter, the series does not emphasize the characters' socioeconomic backgrounds and genders, as they can achieve anything they would like with enough determination. He and his wife often attempt to teach their children the morals communicated on the show and feel that "[i]t's nice to know that someone over at Disney finally has our backs".

U.S. television ratings
According to Dade Hayes, the executive editor of trade publication Broadcasting & Cable, the show was deemed "risky", as it mostly aims to entertain rather than educate. Sofia the First: Once Upon a Princess premiered on Disney Channel on November 18, 2012, garnering 8.17 million viewers (when the Live+7 ratings were tabulated), which made it the number one cable TV telecast of all time for kids 2–5 and girls 2–5. It also set a record for the number one preschool cable TV telecast ever in total viewers and for adults 18–49. The January 2013 series premiere was watched by 2.7 million people, making it the second highest-rated weekday preschool cable debut since August 2000. It also became the highest-rated preschool show premiere categories of kids aged 2–5, girls aged 2–5, adults aged 18–49, and women aged 18–49. By March 2013, Sofia the First was cable television's most-viewed preschool program; The New York Times described the show as "a monster-size new hit". In 2014, "The Curse of Princess Ivy" became the series second highest-rated telecast, garnering an average of approximately 4.7 million viewers. Across all television, it was the number one telecast for children and girls aged 2–5 at the time of broadcast.

Awards and nominations

Controversy
During a press tour in October 2012, a producer identified Sofia as a Latina. The announcement drew both praise and criticism from media outlets. Latinos and fans saw it as a new milestone for Disney and lauded the choice of a light skin tone for a Latina character. Others were critical that she did not have any cultural signifiers or ethnic identity and believed a darker skin tone would better represent the Latina community. A Disney Junior general manager later clarified: "Sofia is a fairytale girl who lives in a fairytale world. All our characters come from fantasy lands that may reflect elements of various cultures and ethnicities but none are meant to specifically represent those real world cultures". According to a Disney spokeswoman, Sofia has a mixed fairy-tale heritage; her mother and father are from Galdiz (which is based on Spain) and Freezenburg (which is based on Scandinavia), respectively.

Other media

Spin-off

Following the controversy regarding Sofia's ethnicity, Gerber noticed the demand for a Latina princess; the idea "bubbled in [his] mind" and partially inspired the creation of spin-off series Elena of Avalor, which stars a Latina princess as its titular character. She is introduced in Sofia the First special episode Elena and the Secret of Avalor, in which Sofia discovers that Elena has been trapped inside her amulet for decades because of an invasion of Avalor by the evil sorceress Shuriki. Sofia and her family travel to Avalor to free Elena and restore the kingdom.

In November 2022, Gerber reportedly expanded his deal with Disney. He began developing a Sofia the First spin-off that is set in the same world.

Merchandising
In January 2013, Disney Junior published a hardcover picture book based on the series, which entered The New York Times Best Seller list, with approximately 450,000 copies sold. Most mainstream merchandise was first released from March to June of that year; the products immediately became best-sellers. At Toys "R" Us, the show's merchandise proved to be one of the some of the most popular toys from June to September. In 2013, merchandise related to Sofia the First and two other Disney Junior shows—Jake and the Neverland Pirates and Doc McStuffins—generated retails sales of $1.8 billion globally. The series was part of the Disney Junior – Live on Stage! at Disney's Hollywood Studios as well as Disney California Adventure. Disney Junior Dance Party on Tour, a tour featuring a 90-minute concert, also includes Sofia the First.

See also

 Disney Princess

Notes

References

External links

 
 
 

 
2010s American animated television series
2010s preschool education television series
2012 American television series debuts
2018 American television series endings
American children's animated adventure television series
American children's animated comedy television series
American children's animated fantasy television series
American children's animated musical television series
American preschool education television series
Animated preschool education television series
Annie Award winners
Animated television series about children
Crossover animated television series
Disney Junior original programming
English-language television shows
Female characters in television
Television series by Disney Television Animation
Television series about princesses
Television about magic
Witchcraft in television
Television series set in fictional countries